Charonosaurus (meaning "Charon's  lizard") is a genus of dinosaur whose fossils were discovered by Godefroit, Zan & Jin in 2000 on the south bank of the Amur River, dividing China from Russia. It is monotypic, consisting of the species C. jiayinensis.

Description
 
It is known from a partial skull (Holotype: CUST J-V1251-57 (Changchun University of Sciences and Technology, Changchun, Jilin Province, China) found in the Late Maastrichtian Yuliangze Formation, west of Jiayin village, Heilongjiang Province, northeastern China. Adult and juvenile hadrosaur remains discovered in the same area and formation likely represent the same taxon and supply information on most of the postcranial skeleton; the femur length was up to 1.35 m (4.5 ft). The partial skull resembles that of Parasaurolophus and probably had a similar long, backward-projecting hollow crest, indicated by the highly modified dorsal surface of the frontal bones. Charonosaurus is one of the largest hadrosaurs currently known from Asia and indicates that lambeosaurines survived until the very end of the Cretaceous (lambeosaurines are not known from the Late Maastrichtian in North America).

History of Discovery
The remains of Charonosaurus come from large bonebeds (bone deposits) discovered since 1975 during excavations by several Chinese institutions around the city of Jiayin on the Amur River. The holotype material (specimen number CUST J-V1251-57), a fragmentary skull, was described as Charonosaurus jiayinensis by Pascal Godefroit, Shuqin Zan and Liyong Jin in 2000. The genus name is derived from Charon, the ferryman from Greek mythology who carried the dead across the dead river Acheron (or Styx), and the ancient Greek word sauros (lizard). The specific epiteth jiayinensis refers to the type locality (site) Jiayin.

Stratigraphically the finds are from the Yuliangze Formation. The first finds from this formation were recovered in the summers of 1916 and 1917 by excavations of the Russian Geological Committee. Among them are bones of hadrosaurids described by Anatoly Riabinin as Manchurosaurus amurensis. Furthermore, Riabinin assigned another find, a very fragmentary ischium, to hadrosaurids and named it Saurolophus krystofovici. Both names are nowadays considered as nomina dubia.

Phylogeny
A cladistic analysis in 2000 by Pascal Godefroit, Shuqin Zan and Liyong Jin based on 33 skull, tooth, and postcranial features shows that Charonosaurus jiayinensis could be phylogenetically more closely related to Parasaurolophus than to any other lambeosaurine. Characteristics that cannot be directly determined on the available bones were not included in the analysis. Eolambia and Tsintaosaurus were also not included in the analysis because these taxa are in need of revision according to Godefroit et al. The following phylogeny was conducted by Penélope Cruzado-Caballero et al. in 2013.

Taphonomy
In the Yuliangze Formation near the village of Jiayin, bone beds were discovered scattered over several tens of square meters, consisting mostly of bones of Charonosaurus jiayinensis. These bone beds contain numerous skeletons of both young and adult animals. They are out of anatomical alignment and intermingled. Long bones are oriented in one direction and the vertebral arches, spinous processes and transverse protrusions of the vertebrae (the apophyses) are broken off. These taphonomic features indicate that the thanatocoenosis formed in a river or stream environment with relatively strong currents, causing dinosaur carcasses to be concentrated and piled up at a low point in the landscape at the time.

The bone beds consist of about 90% lambeosaurine fossils. Bones of ankylosaurs, theropods, turtles, and crocodiles make up the remaining ten percent. The bones of the lambeosaurines of Jiayin belong to only one species, Charonosaurus jiayinensis, and there is no evidence that it lived with any other species of lambeosaurine in this restricted area. The abundance of ejected teeth from carnivorous dinosaurs shows that carcasses of Charonosaurus were torn up and consumed by predators and scavengers and/or that Charonosaurus was killed by these predators on hunts along a river.

Palaeoecology
Charonosaurus jiayinensis is only known from the site at Jiayin. The thanatocoenosis of the type locality of this species further consists of an unidentified hadrosaurine, the lambeosaurine Amurosaurus, an unidentified ankylosaurian, the tyrannosaurid Tarbosaurus bataar, unidentified tortoises, turtles of the species Amuremys planicostata and unidentified crocodiles. The Blagoveschensk thanatocoenosis (Udurchukan Formation, Tsagayan Group) contains, in addition to hadrosaurids, an unidentified titanosaur, unidentified theropods, unidentified turtles, unidentified Nodosauridae, and unidentified crocodiles.

See also

 Timeline of hadrosaur research

References

Lambeosaurines
Late Cretaceous dinosaurs of Asia
Fossil taxa described in 2000
Taxa named by Pascal Godefroit
Ornithischian genera